Lauren C. Vaughan is an American civil servant from Washington, D.C. who served as Secretary of the District of Columbia from 2015 to 2018.

Education 
Vaughan earned a Bachelor of Arts degree in Mass Media Arts from Hampton University and a Master of Science in Engineering and Technology Management from George Washington University.

Career 
She has since worked in various organizations as trainer, manager and chief executive. From 2001 she was Co-Chair and Board Chair of My Sister's Place, a domestic violence shelter. From 2009 to 2015, she was Chief Executive of My Sister's Place.

Vaughan became Secretary of the District of Columbia on January 2, 2015 as a member of the Democratic Party. She served until December 11, 2018.

References 

20th-century births
American social activists
George Washington University School of Engineering and Applied Science alumni
Hampton University alumni
Living people
Secretaries of the District of Columbia
Washington, D.C., Democrats
Women in Washington, D.C., politics
Year of birth missing (living people)
21st-century American women politicians
21st-century American politicians